is a Japanese manga series written and illustrated by Rikachi. The series began serialization in Be Love in October 2019. As of November 2022, the series has been collected into nine tankōbon volumes.

In 2022, Nina the Starry Bride won the 46th Kodansha Manga Award in the shōjo category.

Publication
Written and illustrated by Rikachi, the series began serialization in Be Love on October 1, 2019. As of November 2022, the series' individual chapters have been collected into nine tankōbon volumes.

In February 2021, Kodansha USA announced that they licensed the series for English publication. During their panel at Anime NYC 2022, Kodansha USA announced a print release for Fall 2023.

Volume list

Reception
Nina the Starry Bride won the 46th Kodansha Manga Award in the shōjo category in 2022. Yuka Shiraishi from  listed the series as the sixth Best Manga in 2021.

Brianna Fox-Priest from Otaku USA praised character designs and story, and stated "There are more thrilling romance manga out, but this one has room to grow. Judging by the covers of future installments, Nina The Starry Bride has more story to unfold". As part of Anime News Network's spring 2021 manga guide, Rebecca Silverman and Lynzee Loveridge reviewed the series for the website. Silverman praised the main protagonist, artwork, story, and stated "It is worth reading. The art is clean and shows some beautiful use of detail especially in the clothes, there is just enough intrigue to keep things moving". Loveridge had similar opinions about the series.

References

External links
  
 

Fantasy anime and manga
Josei manga
Kodansha manga
Winner of Kodansha Manga Award (Shōjo)